Cybaeus abchasicus is a spider species found in Turkey, Georgia, and Russia. It lives in caves.

See also 
 List of Cybaeidae species

References

External links 

Cybaeidae
Spiders of Georgia (country)
Spiders of Russia
Arthropods of Turkey
Spiders described in 1947
Spiders of Europe
Cave spiders